Anas is a genus of dabbling ducks.

Anas or ANAS may also refer to:

Species
Anas albeola, or Bufflehead, a small sea duck
Anas aucklandica, the Auckland teal
Anas melleri, Meller's duck
Anas platyrhynchos, the mallard, a wild duck

People
Anas (أنس) is an Arabic name used by Muslims.

Mononym
 Anas ibn Malik (612-712–709), Companion (Sahabi) of prophet Muhammad
 Anas (journalist), Ghanaian anti-corruption journalist

Given name
 Anas al-Abdah (born 1967), Syrian politician, president of the National Coalition for Syrian Revolutionary and Opposition Forces from March 2016 to May 2017
 Anas Altikriti (born 1968), British activist of Iraqi origin, founder of the Cordoba Foundation
 Anas Aremeyaw Anas, Ghanaian investigative journalist
 Anas Dabour (born 1991), Arab-Israeli footballer
 Anas Alam Faizli, Malaysian constructor, oil professional, activist and author
 Anas el-Fiqqi, Egyptian politician and government minister
 Anas Edathodika (born 1987), Indian footballer
 Anas Al Khalifa (born 1993), paracanoist
 Anas Osama Mahmoud (born 1995), Egyptian basketball player
 Anas Rashid, Indian television actor in Indian soap operas
 Anas Khalid Al Saleh (born 1972), Kuwaiti politician
 Anas Sari (born 1977), Syrian footballer
 Anas Sarwar (born 1983), Scottish politician
 Anas Sefrioui (born 1957), Moroccan real estate businessman
 Anas Sharbini (born 1987), Croatian footballer
 Anas Urbaningrum (born 1969), Indonesian graft prisoner and politician
 Anas Abu-Yousuf (born 1989), Qatari swimmer

Surname
Azwar Anas (1931–2023), Indonesian politician
Muhammed Anas (born 1994), Indian sprinter
Mohammed Anas (born 1994), Ghanaian footballer
Omar Anas (born 1933), Sudanese sportsman, shooter

Nom de guerre
Abdullah Anas, an Algerian scholar, nom de guerre of a man who helped Afghanistan mujahideen fight the Soviet invasion in the northern provinces from 1983 to 1992
Abu Anas al-Shami (died 2004), real name Omar Yusef Juma'a, Palestinian jihadist from Kuwait
Abu Anas al-Libi (1964–2015), real name Nazih Abdul-Hamed Nabih al-Ruqai'i, computer specialist for Al-Qaeda from Libya
Muhannad (jihadist) (1969–2011), real name Melfi Al Hussaini Al Harbi, nom de guerre Abu Anas, a mujahid emir (commander) of Chechnya

Other uses
 American Numismatic and Archaeological Society, a former name of the American Numismatic Society
 Anas (company), formerly "Azienda Nazionale Autonoma delle Strade", a state-owned company that constructs and operates Italian motorways
 Flumen Anas, the Roman name for the river Guadiana in Spain

See also
 Ana (disambiguation)
 Abu Anas (disambiguation)

Arabic masculine given names